Bowery is an anglicization of Bouwerie, the archaic form of the Dutch for "farm", that was used in numerous New Netherland placenames. It most prominently refers to a street in Lower Manhattan, New York City.

Bowery may also refer to:

People
 Jordan Bowery, footballer who plays for Championship club Rotherham United
 Leigh Bowery, performance artist, club creature, and clothing designer
 Norman Bowery, British pharmacologist

Arts and entertainment

Film
 The Bowery (film), a 1933 historical film about the Lower East Side of Manhattan at the turn of the century
 On the Bowery, a 1956 documentary film directed by Lionel Rogosin

Music
 Bowery Electric, an American post-rock band
 William Bowery, a pseudonym for Joe Alwyn.

Songs
 "The Bowery" (song), a song from the musical A Trip to Chinatown with music by Percy Gaunt and lyrics by Charles H. Hoyt 
 "The Bowery Electric", a song by Jed Davis

Groups and organizations
 Bowery Amphitheatre, a building on Bowery in New York City
 Bowery Ballroom, a music venue on Delancey Street in New York City
 Bowery Boys, an anti-immigrant and anti-Catholic gang based north of the Five Points district in Manhattan, New York City
 The Bowery Boys, fictional New York City characters, portrayed by a company of New York actors
 Bowery Mission, a rescue mission on Bowery in Manhattan, New York City
 Bowery Theatre, a playhouse formerly located on Lafayette Street in New York City
 Bowery Savings Bank, a New York City bank chartered in 1834

Other uses
 Bowery Bay, a bay in New York City
 Bowery station, a New York City Subway station on the  services of the New York City Subway
 Operation Bowery, an Anglo-American naval operation of World War II